People with the name Mary Louisa include:

 Mary Louisa Armitt (1851–1911) British polymath
 Mary Louisa Bruce, Countess of Elgin (1819–1898)
 Mary Louisa Chitwood (1832–1855), American poet
 Mary Louisa Gordon (1861−1941) British prison inspector
 Mary Louisa Molesworth (1839–1921), English writer of children's stories
 Mary Louisa Page (1849–1921), American architect
 Mary Louisa Georgina Petrie (1861–1935), British author
 Mary Louisa Skinner (1876–1955), Australian Quaker, nurse, and writer, wrote a memoir of World War I experiences
 Mary Louisa Toynbee (born 1946), British journalist
 Mary Louisa Whately (1824–1889), English missionary in Egypt, known for building schools
 Mary Louisa White (1866–1935), British composer
 Mary Louisa Willard (1898–1993), forensic scientist

See also

 Mary Louise (name)
 Mary Louise (disambiguation)
 Marie Louise (disambiguation)
 Maria Louisa
 Mary Lou (name)
 Marylou (disambiguation)
 Marilu
 
 Mary (given name)
 Louisa (disambiguation)

Compound given names